Scolecoseps acontias, also known commonly as the sandy limbless skink, is a species of lizard in the family Scincidae. The species is endemic to Tanzania.

Geographic range
S. acontias is found in eastern coastal Tanzania.

Habitat

Reproduction
S. acontias is viviparous.

References

Further reading
Broadley DG, Howell KM (1991). "A check list of the reptiles of Tanzania, with synoptic keys". Syntarsus 1: 1–70. (Scolecoseps acontias, p. 15).
Loveridge A (1942). "Scientific Results of a Fourth Expedition to Forested Areas in East and Central Africa. IV. Reptiles". Bulletin of the Museum of Comparative Zoölogy at Harvard College 91 (1): 237–373. (Scolecoseps acontias, new combination, p. 359).
Spawls S, Howell K, Hinkel H, Menegon M (2018). Field Guide to East African Reptiles, Second Edition. London: Bloomsbury Natural Histury. 624 pp. . (Scolecoseps acontias, p. 177).
Werner F (1913). "Neue oder seltene Reptilien und Frösche des Naturhistorischen Museums in Hamburg ". Mitteilungen aus dem Hamburgischen Zoologischen Museum und Institut 30: 1–51. (Melanoseps acontias, new species, p. 19). (in German). 

acontias
Reptiles of Tanzania
Reptiles described in 1913
Taxa named by Franz Werner